Ala-Too Square (Ala-Too ayantı, ; , Ploshchad' Ala-Too) is the central square in Bishkek, Kyrgyzstan.

History
The square was built in 1984 to celebrate the 60th anniversary of the Kirghiz Soviet Socialist Republic, at which time a massive statue of Lenin was placed in the square's center. The square was known as Lenin Square until Kyrgyzstan gained its Independence from the USSR in 1991. The statue of Lenin was moved in 2003 to a smaller square in the city, and a new statue called Erkindik (Freedom) was installed in its place. Later in 2011 it was replaced by a statue of Manas, to celebrate the 20th anniversary of Kyrgyzstan's independence.

Protests 
On March 24, 2005, the square was the site of the largest antigovernmental protest of Kyrgyzstan's Tulip Revolution. After several weeks of unrest throughout the country, over 15,000 people gathered early in the afternoon to protest the results of the 2005 parliamentary elections. Two people were killed and over 100 wounded when the protesters clashed with government officials. However, the protesters soon took control of the square, and stormed the White House, forcing Askar Akayev, Kyrgyzstan's first president, to flee the country and later resign from office.

Events 
The square serves as a place for state events and celebrations. In 2008, it was the site of a memorial ceremony for world-renowned Kyrgyz writer Chinghiz Aitmatov.

On the 70th anniversary of the Second World War in 2015, the first Victory Day military parade on Ala-Too Square took place in the presence of Prime Minister Temir Sariyev and Chief of the Armed Forces General Staff Asanbek Alymkozhoev.

In September 2020, manaschi Doolot Sydykov recited the Epic of Manas continuously for a record 14 hours and 27 minutes.

Layout
The square is crossed by Chuy Prospekt. Buildings and monuments around the square include the Kyrgyz State Historical Museum.

References

External links

Webcam of Ala-Too Square

Squares in Bishkek